Giovanni De Gennaro (born 21 July 1992) is an Italian slalom canoeist who has competed at the international level since 2008. He competed at the 2020 Summer Olympics.

Career
De Gennaro won three medals at the ICF Canoe Slalom World Championships with a gold (K1 team: 2013) a silver (K1: 2022) and a bronze (K1 team: 2011). He also won two silvers and one bronze medal at the European Championships.

De Gennaro competed at two Olympic Games. In his first Olympic participation he finished 7th in the K1 event at the 2016 Summer Olympics in Rio de Janeiro. He then finished 14th in the K1 event at the delayed 2020 Summer Olympics in Tokyo after being eliminated in the semifinal.

Personal life
De Gennaro lives in Roncadelle (Brescia) and he was a member of Corpo Forestale dello Stato, now Carabinieri. His brother Riccardo is a former slalom canoeist. Slalom canoeist Stefanie Horn is Giovanni's sister-in-law.

World Cup individual podiums

References

External links 

 
 
 
 Giovanni De Gemmaro at CanoeSlalom.net

Living people
Italian male canoeists
1992 births
Canoeists at the 2016 Summer Olympics
Olympic canoeists of Italy
Medalists at the ICF Canoe Slalom World Championships
Canoeists of Centro Sportivo Carabinieri
Canoeists at the 2020 Summer Olympics
21st-century Italian people